Invidious Dominion is the eleventh studio album by the Floridian death metal band Malevolent Creation. It was released in North America on August 24, 2010 via Nuclear Blast, and in Europe on August 27. A music video was created for "Slaughter House", directed by Chris Cullari. It was released on November 17, 2010 via YouTube.

Track listing

Personnel
Bret Hoffmann - vocals
Gio Geraca - lead guitar
Phil Fasciana - rhythm guitar
Jason Blachowicz - bass guitar
Gus Rios - drums

References

Malevolent Creation albums
2010 albums
Albums with cover art by Pär Olofsson